Spotlight 29 Casino is an Indian casino in Coachella, California, owned and operated by the Twenty-Nine Palms Band of Mission Indians of California. The casino is 250,000 square feet, with 1,600 slot machines and 22 table games. Amenities include two restaurants, food court, three bars and the Spotlight Showroom, which seats 2,200.

History
Spotlight 29 Casino opened in January 1995 to the public under the right of the National Indian Gaming Regulatory Act of 1988, allowing Native American Tribes to operate casinos. In March 2001, the Twenty-Nine Palms Band of Mission Indians teamed with Donald Trump and Spotlight 29 Casino became Trump 29 Casino, opening on April 2, 2002. In 2006, the relationship with Donald Trump ended, and the casino returned to its original name, after which many renovations were completed including a new 1,200 vehicle parking structure and an expansion of nearly 150,000 square feet, updating the casino to include nearly 250,000 square feet for gaming, offices, meetings and conferences, dining and entertainment.

Gaming

Slots 
Spotlight 29 Casino has 1,600 slot machines, including a high limit slot area and the most penny games in the Coachella Valley. Guests must be 21 or older to gamble on the property.

Table Games 
22 table games including:
 Blackjack
 Spanish 21
 Single Deck Blackjack
 Three Card Poker
 Fortune Pai Gow
 Mini Baccarat
 Mystery Card Roulette
 Ultimate Texas Hold'em

Entertainment

Spotlight Showroom 
The Spotlight Showroom has 2,200 seats for live concerts, entertainment, sporting events, conferences, and special events. The Showroom also hosts the Twenty-Nine Palms Band of Mission Indian's annual Winter POW WOW as well as Theresa A. Mike Scholarship Foundation's annual Fashion Show.

References

External links
 

Casinos in Riverside County, California
Native American casinos
Coachella, California
Native American history of California